Below Zero (1998) is an album by the American ambient musician Robert Rich. It is a compilation of work that was released on multi-artist collections, works created for such albums due later that year, and previously unreleased tracks.

It is the second compilation of this type released by Robert Rich, the first being A Troubled Resting Place (1996). It also follows a similar style to A Troubled Resting Place, consisting of turbulent organic atmospheres.

Track listing
"Star Maker" – 21:24
"Interstellar Travel"
"Worlds Innumerable"
"The Beginning and the End"
"The Myth of Creation"
(Originally released on Narratives: Works of Fiction, 1996)
"Dissolving the Seeds of a Moment" – 10:42
(Previously unreleased.)
"A Flock of Metal Creatures Fleeing the Onslaught of Rust" – 7:02
(Recorded for the Multimood 10th Anniversary Compilation, released later in 1998)
"Termite Epiphany" – 8:16
(Recorded for Dry Lungs VI, released later in 1998)
"Liquid Air" – 9:00
(Originally released on From Here to Tranquility II, 1994)
"Requiem" – 7:35
(Originally released on Soundscapes Gallery, 1996)

References

External links
Listen to Below Zero with Rhapsody
Robert Rich Official Site

Robert Rich (musician) albums
1998 compilation albums